The 12th Pan American Games were held in Mar del Plata, Argentina from March 11 to March 26, 1995.

Medals

Silver

Men's Javelin Throw: Edgar Baumann

Bronze

Women's Lightweight (– 60 kg): Paola Viveros

Men's Kumite (Team): Paraguay

Results by event

Field hockey

Men's competition

Women's competition

Football

Group A

Quarterfinals

Handball

Men's Competitions

See also
Paraguay at the 1996 Summer Olympics

References

Nations at the 1995 Pan American Games
Pan American Games
1995